Guido Biscaretti di Ruffia (28 October 1867 – 21 October 1946) was an Italian soldier and politician.

Biography
Guido was the son of Senator Count  and of  noblewoman Beatrice Ferrero, as well as nephew of Senator Carlo Biscaretti di Ruffia and brother of the technical designer Carlo Biscaretti di Ruffia.

Having committed to a military career, he enrolled in the Italian Naval Academy on 18 October 1881. He became a member of the Società Geografica Italiana in 1908 and developed an interest in military cartography for the navy. In 1911-1912 he took part in the Italo-Turkish War with the rank of frigate captain in command of the destroyer . On 21 May 1916, during the First World War, he was appointed aide-de-camp to King Vittorio Emanuele III, and maintained the honorary title until 1917. While in Rome, he married Maria Volo and became father of two children, Roberto and Paolo. He became President of the Superior Navy Council (10 August 1923 - 1 August 1925), Squadron Admiral in 1926 and then Senator on 22 December 1928.

He fell from the office of Senator in 1945 and died in Rome the following year.

Awards
Order of Saints Maurice and Lazarus, knight
Order of the Crown of Italy, knight
Military Order of Savoy, knight (March 16, 1913)
Maurician medal
Cross of Seniority, gold cross
Gold Medal of Honor for Long Maritime Navigation
War Merit Cross (3 Awarded)
Commemorative Medal for the Italo-Turkish War 1911-1912
Commemorative Medal for the Italo-Austrian War 1915–1918
Commemorative Medal of the Unity of Italy
Inter-Allied Medal

Foreign Awards
: Order of Leopold, Grand Officer
: Order of Saint Alexander, knight and grand cross
: Order of the Double Dragon, Knight of the 2nd Degree, 2nd Class
: Order of the Dannebrog, knight and grand cross
: Legion of Honour, commander
: Order of the Red Eagle, 2nd Class and knight
: Order of George I, Grand Cross
: Order of the Paulownia Flowers, grand cordon
: Order of the Rising Sun, 1st Class and Knight
: Order of the Sacred Treasure, 3rd Class and Knight
: Order of Saint-Charles, knight and grand cross
: Order of Prince Danilo I, Grand Officer
 Qajar Iran: Order of the Lion and the Sun, knight and great star
: Order of Saint Anna, 2nd Class and Knight
: Order of St Michael and St George, knight and commander
: Order of the Liberator, officer

References

Regia Marina personnel
1867 births
1946 deaths
Italian military personnel of the Italo-Turkish War
Italian military personnel of World War I
Politicians of Piedmont
Politicians from Turin
Knights Grand Cross of the Order of Saints Maurice and Lazarus
Grand Crosses of the Order of the Dannebrog
Knights of the Order of the Dannebrog
Commandeurs of the Légion d'honneur
Grand Crosses of the Order of George I
Grand Cordons of the Order of the Rising Sun
Recipients of the Order of the Sacred Treasure, 3rd class
Grand Crosses of the Order of Saint-Charles
Knights of the Order of Saint-Charles
Recipients of the Order of St. Anna, 2nd class
Knights Commander of the Order of St Michael and St George